Yanuq (also known as Yānīq) is a village in Nazarkahrizi Rural District, Nazarkahrizi District, Hashtrud County, East Azerbaijan Province, Iran. At the 2006 census, its population was 452, in 84 families.

References 

Towns and villages in Hashtrud County